Kent is a civil parish in the northeastern corner of Carleton County, New Brunswick, Canada. It comprises one village, two local service districts, and part of one town, all of which are members of the Western Valley Regional Service Commission (WVRSC).

The Census subdivision of Kent Parish includes all of the civil parish except the two municipalities.

Origin of name
The parish was named in memory of the Duke of Kent, father of Queen Victoria.

History
Kent was erected in 1821 within York County from "all that part of the County of York lying above the Parish of Wakefield, on both sides of the River Saint John," territory previously unassigned to any parish. This sweeping description included modern Kent Parish, Wicklow Parish, Aberdeen Parish, parts of Brighton, Peel, and Stanley Parishes; Madawaska County; most of Victoria County; the western part of Restigouche County; and parts of Maine and Quebec then claimed by New Brunswick.

Boundaries
Kent Parish is bounded:

 on the west by the Saint John River;
 on the north by Victoria County;
 on the south and east by a line running due east from opposite the mouth of Whitemarsh Brook to a reserved road along the western line of grants on the Ketchum Ridge Road, then north along reserved roads on the western side of land grants along the Ketchum Ridge, West Glassville, Old West Glassville, Shikatehawk, and Denney Hill Roads to the north line of a grant south of the junction of the Denney Hill and Burke Roads, running briefly northeasterly to the northwestern corner of a lot west of the end of Kenneth Road before turning due east and running to the York County line, then running northeast along York County until it meets the Victoria County line.

Evolution of boundaries
Kent's 1821 boundaries gave it all of the province west of Northumberland County, including the province's claims to northern Maine and parts of Québec.

In 1832 Kent was included in the newly erected Carleton County; The eastern county line cut through Kent Parish.

In 1833 the sheer size of Kent Parish lead to it being split into five parishes. Wicklow and Andover comprised all of the parish west of the Saint John River, Perth all of Kent east of the Saint John between the modern county line and Grand Falls, and Madawaska all of Kent north of Grand Falls; the orphaned area in York County became unassigned land in that county. Kent retained its modern territory plus Aberdeen Parish and eastern Peel and Brighton Parishes.

In 1841 the southern boundary of Brighton Parish was changed, causing a change in its northern boundary due to its wording, removing all of modern Brighton and Peel Parishes and southern Aberdeen.

In 1850 the northern line was rotated to run due east from the mouth of the River de Chute. Kent gained a small area on the bank of the Saint John but lost a large triangle of territory that included the modern communities of Chapmanville, Kilfoil, Killoween, Maplehurst, and Moose Mountain.

In 1863 the southeastern part of Kent formed the bulk of Aberdeen Parish, removing Glassville and Knowlesville Settlements.

In 1864 the original northern line of Carleton County was restored, reversing the 1850 changes.

In 1896 the boundary with Aberdeen Parish underwent minor changes, taking a long narrow triangle of territory from Kent.

In 1956 a stretch of Crown Reserved Road along the western boundary of Aberdeen Parish was transferred to Kent, possibly in error.

Municipalities
The town of Florenceville-Bristol occupies the southwestern corner of the parish along the Saint John River.

The village of Bath comprises an irregular area along the Saint John River south of the Monquart Stream.

Local service districts
Both LSDs assess for the basic LSD services of fire protection, police services, land use planning, emergency measures, and dog control.

Kent Parish
The local service district of the parish of Kent originally comprised all of the parish outside the villages of Bath and Bristol.

It was established on 23 November 1966 to assess for fire protection following the abolition of county governments by the new Municipalities Act. 
Community services were added on 20 December 1967 and non-fire related rescue on 23 October 2015.

Today the LSD additionally assesses for community & recreation services. The taxing authority is 209.00 Kent.

LSD advisory committee: Yes, as of September 2017. Chair Alma Kilfoil served on the WVRSC board from at least 2015 until her resignation on 30 September 2017.

Upper Kent
Upper Kent comprises a narrow strip along the Saint John River around the community of Upper Kent.

It was established on 27 June 1968 to add street lighting, community planning, and garbage collection. Non-fire related rescue was added on 23 October 2015.

Today Upper Kent additionally assesses for street lighting and community & recreation services. The taxing authority is 220.00 Upper Kent.

LSD advisory committee: unknown

Communities
Communities at least partly within the parish. bold indicates an incorporated municipality

  Bath
 Beaufort
 Beechwood
 Carlow
 Chapmanville
 Clearview
 Fielding
 Florenceville-Bristol
 Giberson Settlement
  Gordonsville
 Halls Corner
 Holmesville
  Johnville
 Kenneth
 Kilfoil
 Killoween
 Lockharts Mill
 Maplehurst
 Mineral
 Monquart
 Moose Mountain
 Murphy Corner
 Piercemont
 River de Chute Siding
 South Johnville
 Tarrtown
  Upper Kent
 Welch

Bodies of water
Bodies of water at least partly within the parish.

 Odell River
  Saint John River
  North Branch Southwest Miramichi River
 Dyer Branch
 Little Shikatehawk Stream
 Monquart Stream
 Shikatehawk Stream
 Beaver Brook Lake
 Green Lake
 Lost Lake
 Moose Mountain Lake
 Murphy Lake
 Priest Lake

Other notable places
Parks, historic sites, and other noteworthy places at least partly within the parish.
 Beechwood Dam
 Bristol Aerodrome
 McCluskey Brook Protected Natural Area
 Porcupine Mountain Protected Natural Area
 Upper Kent Aerodrome

Demographics
Parish population total does not include Bath and portion within Florenceville-Bristol

Population
Population trend

Language
Mother tongue (2016)

See also
List of parishes in New Brunswick

Notes

References

External links
 Village of Bath

Parishes of Carleton County, New Brunswick
Local service districts of Carleton County, New Brunswick